Sonika Kaliraman is an Indian woman professional wrestler to win the title of Bharat Kesri in Bharat Kesri Dangal in 2001. She was a contestant on the popular reality show Bigg Boss in 2011.

Personal life 
Kaliraman is the daughter of former wrestler Chandgi Ram (Master Chadgiram). She was trained by her father who always dreamt of his four daughters becoming wrestlers. He even had to fight against social norms and with the Indian Wrestling Foundation for many years. She won gold at the Asian Women Wrestling Championship in 2000. 

Her brother Jagdish Kaliraman is also a wrestler. She married US-based businessman, Siddharth Malik.

Kaliraman alleged that in 1998-99 when she traveled to Poland as part of a junior sub-team, she was sexually harassed by the coach there. She complained to her father as well as the WFI president GS Mander. However, GS Mander refuted these statements and also said that he will file a defamation suit against her.

Career 
Kaliraman is one of 200 Indian women who wrestle professionally. She is also one of the 50 Indian women who represented India internationally. She won a gold medal at the Asian Women Wrestling Championship in 2000.

In August 2009, she participated in Fear Factor: Khatron Ke Khiladi (season 2) and participated in Bigg Boss 5.

She demanded Open Trials for selection into the National Squad after she was dropped.

Television

See also
Wrestling at the 2006 Asian Games
Zor Ka Jhatka: Total Wipeout

References

Indian female sport wrestlers
Living people
Wrestlers at the 2006 Asian Games
1983 births
Sportswomen from Delhi
21st-century Indian women
21st-century Indian people
Fear Factor: Khatron Ke Khiladi participants
Bigg Boss (Hindi TV series) contestants
Asian Games competitors for India